The Saint in Manhattan is a 1987 television pilot for an Australian-filmed, US-backed revival series based on The Saint starring Andrew Clarke as Simon Templar. The pilot was not picked up for a series but on June 12, 1987, it was broadcast as the first installment of CBS Summer Playhouse, a series that aired unsold television pilots during the summer season. In 2012, the pilot was released on DVD by Madman Entertainment in Australia. The DVD has since been out of print.

Plot
The Saint returns to New York City, feeling restless and bored. But the tedium is about to escalate to full-blown excitement when he is contacted by an old flame, Margo, a ballerina who is set to star in a high profile performance. She has received death threats in the guise of a mutilated doll being left in her dressing room, and as part of the ballet, she will don a million dollar tiara on opening night. The performance goes without mishap, however, upon leaving the stage the tiara has somehow been swapped with a fake, and The Saint's calling card has been left in its empty box. Someone has framed Simon, and his old adversary Inspector Fernack is quick to point the finger.

Production
The pilot was shot in Manhattan in April 1987.

Cast
 Andrew Clarke as Simon Templar
 Kevin Tighe as Inspector John Fernack
 George Rose as Woods
 Christopher Marcantel as Joey
 Holland Taylor as Fran Grogan
 Caitlin Clarke as Lily Palmer / Jessica Daniels
 Liliana Komorowska as Margot Katka

Reception
The Sydney Morning Herald wrote that Andrew Clarke was not well suited for the role, especially in contrast to Roger Moore in the 1967 television series. The Los Angeles Times reported that most of the viewers who watched the pilot on CBS Summer Playhouse voted "yes". Despite this, the series was never picked up.

Critics also compared The Saint's physical appearance to Thomas Magnum in Magnum, P.I., especially with his mustache. Also, the black Lamborghini Countach 5000QV used by The Saint was compared to Magnum's red Ferrari 308 GTS.

References

External links

1987 American television episodes
Television films as pilots
Television pilots not picked up as a series
1980s American television specials